Geelmuyden is a surname. Notable people with the surname include:

August Geelmuyden Spørck (1851–1928), Norwegian military officer and politician for the Liberal Party
Christian Torber Hegge Geelmuyden (1816–1885), Norwegian navy officer and politician
Hans Geelmuyden (1844–1920), Norwegian astronomer
Ivar Christian Sommerschild Geelmuyden (1819–1875), Norwegian politician
Knud Geelmuyden Fleischer Maartmann (1821–1888), Norwegian politician
Kristian Geelmuyden (born 1875), Norwegian politician for the Conservative Party
Marie Geelmuyden (1856–1935), Norwegian chemist, teacher and textbook author, first Norwegian woman to receive a degree in science
Niels Christian Geelmuyden (born 1960), Norwegian journalist and writer, mostly known for his interviews and essays